Horse of a Different Color is the debut studio album by American country music duo Big & Rich, released on May 4, 2004, by Warner Bros. Nashville. The album contains the hit singles "Wild West Show", "Save a Horse (Ride a Cowboy)", "Holy Water", and "Big Time". Respectively, these reached No. 21, No. 11, No. 15, and No. 20 on the Billboard Hot Country Songs charts. The album was certified 3× Platinum by the RIAA for shipments of three million copies.

Content
Horse of a Different Color features several guest musicians, primarily members of the MuzikMafia, the collaborative singer-songwriter group that Big & Rich founded. Country rap artist Cowboy Troy is featured on the lead-off track "Rollin' (The Ballad of Big & Rich)", and makes an uncredited guest appearance at the end of "Kick My Ass". Gretchen Wilson provides background vocals on "Saved", and Jon Nicholson on "Love Train". The only guest musician who is not a MuzikMafia member is Martina McBride, who provides backing vocals on the final track, "Live This Life". Big Kenny and John Rich, who comprise the duo, co-wrote all the tracks on the album, and co-produced it with Paul Worley.

Four singles were released from this album. Lead-off single "Wild West Show" peaked at No. 21 on the Billboard country charts in early 2004. Following it was "Save a Horse (Ride a Cowboy)", which peaked at No. 11 and was certified platinum by the RIAA as a single. The third single release, the No. 15 "Holy Water", was inspired by Big Kenny's and John Rich's sisters, both victims of domestic abuse. "Big Time" was the final single, reaching No. 20 in mid-2005.

Track listing

Personnel
As listed in liner notes.
Big & Rich
 Big Kenny - vocals 
 John Rich - vocals, acoustic guitar

Additional musicians
 Brian Barnett - drums (4-9, 11), tambourine (6, 7)
 Steve Brewster - drums (12), shaker (12)
 Dennis Burnside - keyboards (2, 9, 11)
 Cowboy Troy - "multilingual 'hick-hop' rap" (1), vocals (4)
 Owen Hale - drums (10)
 Mike Johnson - steel guitar (1-8,11,12)
 Wayne Killius - drums (1-3,13), shaker (2), peanut can (2), tambourine (13)
 Martina McBride - background vocals (13)
 Duncan Mullins - bass guitar (2)
 Jon Nicholson - background vocals (11)
 Matt Pierson - bass guitar (1,3-8,10-13)
 Michael Rojas - keyboards (1,3-8,10-13)
 Adam Shoenfeld - electric guitar
 Nicole Summers - flute (2)
 Justin Tocket - bass guitar (9)
 Gretchen Wilson - background vocals (7)
 Paul Worley - "yeehaw juice" (4)
 Jonathan Yudkin - fiddle (1,3,4,7,8,9,11,12), banjo (1,8,9,12), strings (1,6,7,13), string composer (1,6,7,13), string arrangements (1,6,7,13), mandolin (6,7), harp (7)

Technical
 Richard Dodd - mastering
 Big Kenny - production
 Bart Pursley - recording, mixing
 John Rich - production
 Paul Worley - production

Chart performance

Weekly charts

Year-end charts

Singles

Certifications

References

2004 debut albums
Big & Rich albums
Warner Records albums
Albums produced by Paul Worley
Albums produced by John Rich